Red Nose Day 2017 was a fund-raising event organised by Comic Relief, broadcast live on BBC One and BBC Two from the evening of 24 March 2017 to early the following morning. This 2017 edition of Red Nose Day was part of the "Make Your Laugh Matter" campaign. It was held on Friday 24 March till Saturday 25 March 2017 from 7:00 pm to 2:30 am on BBC One.

Location and format
Following the closure of BBC Television Centre in 2013, Comic Relief has had to look for new venues to host the annual telethons as they were previously filmed live from Studio One. Sport Relief 2014 was the first not to be filmed at Television Centre, but at the Copper Box in London's Olympic Park. As a result, Red Nose Day 2015 came live, for the first time in its history, from the heart of London in its most prestigious theatre, the London Palladium.

For the 2017 telethon the broadcast was moved from the London Palladium to Building Six at The O2. This choice of venue, otherwise known as the "Comedy Superclub", also marks the change in tone and format of this year's telethon from an entertainment programme hosted by television presenters back to its original format, a comedy show hosted by comedians. This change in tone is also seen in the hosting line up which is dominated by comedians rather than presenters and for the first time in over 10 years does not feature Davina McCall or Claudia Winkleman.

Before main event

Documentaries

The Red Nose Convoy

Television and Radio

Let's Sing and Dance for Comic Relief

Sara Cox's 24 Hour 80s Danceathon

BBC Radio 1's LOLathon

#RedOut
For Red Nose Day 2017, 35 of Britain's biggest vloggers and bloggers took part in the Comic Relief campaign branded as #RedOut. On Sunday 12 March, big social media names such as Zoella, Alfie Deyes and Marcus Butler went offline for 24 hours to promote the charity. The social media personalities used their platforms to promote an exciting video they would be uploading at 6pm, shocking fans with a short 7 second video and a link to the charity's website. They signed off their accounts urging followers to donate and get involved before returning in 24 hours with Red Nose Day themed videos for their subscribers.

British industry

Main event

Presenters

Schedule
The telethon has traditionally taken the format of one broadcast with various presenting teams hosting for typically an hour at a time introducing a variety of sketches and appeal films. The 2017 broadcast differed as the broadcast was split into separate sections, with separate hosts, focusing on a specific theme or skit rather than featuring numerous sketches, appeal films and performances.

Appeal films

Russell Howard, Ed Sheeran, Emeli Sandé, Miranda Hart and Sara Cox fronted the appeal films for the 2017 telethon.

Sketches and features

Musical performances

Cast

Fiona Allen
Rowan Atkinson
Gary Barlow
Rob Beckett
Matt Berry
Frankie Boyle
Katy Brand
Russell Brand
Billy Connolly
Steve Coogan
James Corden
Sara Cox
Richard Curtis
Tom Daley
Greg Davies
Cara Delevingne
Hugh Dennis
Joel Dommett
Howard Donald
Chiwetel Ejiofor
Noel Fielding
Colin Firth
Micky Flanagan
Dawn French
Rebecca Front
Stephen Fry
Hugh Grant
Mel Giedroyc
Miranda Hart
Stephen Hawking
Lenny Henry
Jessica Hynes
Russell Kane
Peter Kay
Anna Kendrick
Keira Knightley
Jeremy Kyle
Andrew Lincoln
Dominic Littlewood
Joe Lycett
Doon Mackichan
Martine McCutcheon
Kate Moss
Diane Morgan
Bob Mortimer
Liam Neeson
Bill Nighy
Graham Norton
Brendan O'Carroll
Luisa Omielan
Richard Osman
Mark Owen
Sue Perkins
Sally Phillips
Rag'n'Bone Man
Gordon Ramsay
Romesh Ranganathan
Jonathan Ross
Emeli Sandé
Jennifer Saunders
Ed Sheeran
Catherine Tate
David Tennant
Johnny Vegas
David Walliams
Rebel Wilson
Ricky Wilson
Reggie Yates

References

Red Nose Day
2017 in British television
March 2017 events in the United Kingdom